Giovanni Delfino (died 1651) was a Roman Catholic prelate who served as Bishop of Belluno (1626–1634).

Biography
Giovanni Delfino was born in 1589. On 9 February 1626, Giovanni Delfino was appointed during the papacy of Pope Urban VIII as Bishop of Belluno. On 22 February 1626, he was consecrated bishop by Antonio Marcello Barberini, Cardinal-Priest of Sant'Onofrio. He served as Bishop of Belluno until his resignation in 1634. He died in 1651.

Episcopal succession
While bishop, he was the principal co-consecrator of: 
Hector de Monte, Bishop of Termoli (1626); 
Nicolaus de Georgiis, Bishop of Hvar (1635); and 
Alvise Marcello, Bishop of Šibenik (1635).

References

External links and additional sources
 (for Chronology of Bishops) 
 (for Chronology of Bishops)  

17th-century Italian Roman Catholic bishops
Bishops appointed by Pope Urban VIII
1589 births
1634 deaths